The Trigo Mountains are a north-south trending mountain range in La Paz County, Arizona, bordering the Colorado River on the east in the Lower Colorado River Valley. The range lies north of the Colorado River as it turns east, north of Martinez Lake and the Imperial Reservoir. The Trigo Mountains are on a north-south stretch of the Colorado River, and form the eastern perimeter of the Imperial National Wildlife Refuge.

Parts of the Trigo Mountains are included in the Trigo Mountains Wilderness and the Yuma Proving Ground.

Specifics of the range 

The Trigo Mountains are north-south trending with the northern and central range arcing to the northeast. The curving range parallels the similar-(half the size) curving range to the southeast, the Chocolate Mountains, and the arc-curving ranges would be presumed to be a resultant of the same time-framed thrust-faulting event during the formation of the Basin and Range Province.

Access 
Access from the south is made at the Colorado River at Martinez Lake, and then a 4-wheel drive dirt road to the Red Cloud Mine. Access to the northern regions is more general, by way of the valley containing the Colorado River Indian Reservation on the east bank of the river in Arizona.

See also 
 List of mountain ranges of La Paz County, Arizona
 List of mountain ranges of Arizona
 Trigo Mountains Wilderness

References

Mountain ranges of the Sonoran Desert
Mountain ranges of the Lower Colorado River Valley
Mountain ranges of La Paz County, Arizona
Mountain ranges of Arizona